Legionella oakridgensis is a Gram-negative bacterium from the genus Legionella which was isolated from industrial cooling tower waters. It is pathogenic.

References

Further reading

External links

Type strain of Legionella oakridgensis at BacDive -  the Bacterial Diversity Metadatabase

Legionellales
Bacteria described in 1983